Llica is a small town in Bolivia.

History
There is evidence to suggest that this small village has existed for over 500 years, probably since before the discovery of America, for the Indians of south-eastern the current Bolivia established lands dedicated to the cultivation of "papa" (potatoes), To provide food to the caravans crossing the plateau, and Llica is mentioned as one such markings Goat Paper, A testament to revisit the Viceroy Francisco de Toledo to the region, dating from 1571.

References

Populated places in Potosí Department